The 2018–19 BYU Cougars men's basketball team represented Brigham Young University in the 2018–19 NCAA Division I men's basketball season. It was head coach Dave Rose's 14th and final season at BYU and the Cougars eighth season as members of the West Coast Conference. The Cougars played their home games at the Marriott Center in Provo, Utah.

Previous season 
The Cougars finished the 2017–18 season 24–11, 11–7 in West Coast Conference play to finish in third place. As the No. 3 seed in the WCC tournament, they defeated San Diego in the quarterfinals and Saint Mary's in the semifinals before losing to Gonzaga in the championship game. They received an at-large bid to the National Invitation Tournament where they were defeated by Stanford in the first round.

Offseason

Departures

Incoming transfers

Recruiting class of 2018

Recruiting class of 2019

Recruiting class of 2020

Roster

Radio
Greg Wrubell and Mark Durrant return to call men's basketball for the 2018–19 season, though Jason Shepherd will fill-in for Wrubell on the Cougar Tipoff while Robbie Bullough will fill-in for the Utah Valley game. The radio network is officially called the Nu Skin BYU Sports Network and can be found throughout Utah, Idaho, and Nationwide on SiriusXM and TuneIn. KSFI will take the place of KSL on November 6 as KSL will be providing election coverage.

Affiliates

BYU Radio- Flagship Station Nationwide (Dish Network 980, Sirius XM 143, TuneIn radio, and byuradio.org)
KSL 102.7 FM and 1160 AM- (Salt Lake City / Provo, Utah and ksl.com)
KSNA- Blackfoot / Idaho Falls/ Pocatello / Rexburg, Idaho
KMXD- Monroe / Manti, Utah
KSVC- Richfield / Manti, Utah
KCLS- St. George, Utah

Schedule and results

|-
!colspan=11 style=| Exhibition

|-
!colspan=11 style=| Non-Conference Regular Season

|-
!colspan=11 style=| WCC regular season

|-
!colspan=11 style=| WCC tournament

Game summaries

Cougar Tipoff
Broadcasters: Spencer Linton & Kristen Kozlowski
Starting Lineups: 
BYU Blue: Jahshire Hardnett, Taylor Maughan, TJ Haws, Dalton Nixon, Connor Harding
BYU White: Rylan Bergersen, Yoeli Childs, McKay Cannon, Gavin Baxter, Jesse Wade

Exhibition: Saint Martin's
Broadcasters: Dave McCann, Blaine Fowler & Lauren McClain
Starting Lineups:
Saint Martin's: Jared Matthews, Jordan Kitchen, Rhett Baerlocher, BJ Standley, E.J. Boyce
BYU: Jahshire Hardnett, Zac Seljaas, Yoeli Childs, TJ Haws, Luke Worthington

Exhibition: Westminster
Broadcasters: Dave McCann,  Blaine Fowler, & Spencer Linton
Starting Lineups: 
Westminster: Brandon Warr, Jake Connor, Joonas Tahvainainen, Alec Monson, Jai Jai Ely
BYU: Jahshire Hardnett, Zac Seljaas, Yoeli Childs, TJ Haws, Luke Worthington

Nevada
Series History: BYU leads series 13–6
Broadcasters: Carter Blackburn & Pete Gillen
Starting Lineups:
BYU: Jahshire Hardnett, Zac Seljaas, Yoeli Childs, TJ Haws, Dalton Nixon
Nevada: Tre'Shawn Thurman, Caleb Martin, Cody Martin, Trey Porter, Jordan Caroline

Utah Valley
Series History: BYU leads 2–1
Broadcasters: Dave McCann,  Blaine Fowler, & Lauren McClain
Starting Lineups: 
Utah Valley: Isaiah White, Jake Toolson, Benjamin Nakwassah, Conner Toolson, Baylee Steele
BYU: Jahshire Hardnett, Zac Seljaas, Yoeli Childs, TJ Haws, Luke Worthington

Northwestern State
Series History: Series even 1–1
Broadcasters: Dave McCann, Blaine Fowler, & Spencer Linton
Starting Lineups:
Northwestern State: C.J. Jones, LaTerrance Reed, Malik Metoyer, Ishmael Lane, Darian Dixon
BYU: Jahshire Hardnett, Zac Seljaas, Yoeli Childs, TJ Haws, Dalton Nixon

Oral Roberts
Series History: BYU leads 5–0
Broadcasters: Dave McCann,  Blaine Fowler, & Spencer Linton
Starting Lineups: 
Oral Roberts: Kaelen Moore, Sam Kearns, Aidan Saunders, Kerwin Smith, Emmanuel Nzekwesi
BYU: Jahshire Hardnett, Zac Seljaas, Yoeli Childs, TJ Haws, Dalton Nixon

Alabama A&M
Series History: First Meeting
Broadcasters: Dave McCann, Blaine Fowler, & Spencer Linton
Starting Lineups:
Alabama A&M: Jalen Reeder, Andre Kennedy, Brandon Miller, Gerron Scissum, Walter Jones Jr. 
BYU: Jahshire Hardnett, Zac Seljaas, Yoeli Childs, TJ Haws, Dalton Nixon

Rice
Series History: BYU leads 5–2
Broadcasters: Dave McCann,  Blaine Fowler, & Spencer Linton
Starting Lineups: 
Rice: Josh Parrish, Ako Adams, Drew Peterson, Jack Williams, Quentin Millora-Brow
BYU: Jahshire Hardnett, Zac Seljaas, Yoeli Childs, TJ Haws, Dalton Nixon

Houston
Series History: Houston leads series 4–2
Broadcasters: Dave McCann, Blaine Fowler, & Lauren McClain
Starting Lineups:
Houston: Armoni Brooks, Corey Davis Jr., Cedrick Alley Jr., Breaon Bradley, Galen Robinson Jr.  
BYU: Jahshire Hardnett, Zac Seljaas, Yoeli Childs, TJ Haws, Dalton Nixon

Illinois State
Series History: BYU leads series 1–0
Broadcasters: Scott Warmann, & Rich Zvosec
Starting Lineups: 
BYU: Jahshire Hardnett, Zac Seljaas, Yoeli Childs, TJ Haws, Dalton Nixon
Illinois State: Zach Copeland, Keyshawn Evans, Phil Fayne, Josh Jefferson, Milik Yarbrough

Weber State
Series History: BYU leads series 33–10
Broadcasters: Dave Fox & Lance Allred
Starting Lineups:
BYU: Jahshire Hardnett, Zac Seljaas, Yoeli Childs, TJ Haws, Dalton Nixon
Weber State: Cody John, Jerrick Harding, Israel Barnes, Brekkott Chapman, Zach Braxton

Utah State
Series History: BYU leads series 142–92
Broadcasters: Dave McCann, Blaine Fowler, & Spencer Linton
Starting Lineups: 
Utah State: Crew Ainge, Sam Merrill, Quinn Taylor, Brock Miller, Neemias Queta
BYU: Jahshire Hardnett, Zac Seljaas, Yoeli Childs, McKay Cannon, TJ Haws

Utah
Series History: BYU leads series 130–128
Broadcasters: Roxy Bernstein & Caron Butler
Starting Lineups:
Utah: Sedrick Barefield, Donnie Tillman, Parker Van Dyke, Riley Battin, Jayce Johnson
BYU: Jahshire Hardnett, Zac Seljaas, Yoeli Childs, TJ Haws, Connor Harding

Portland State
Series History: BYU leads series 1–0
Broadcasters: Dave McCann, Blaine Fowler, & Spencer Linton
Starting Lineups: 
Portland State: Derek Brown, Michael Mayhew, Holland Woods, Brendan Rumel, Hamie Orme
BYU: Jahshire Hardnett, Zac Seljaas, Yoeli Childs, TJ Haws, Connor Harding

UNLV
Series History: UNLV leads series 18–16
Broadcasters: Eric Rothman & Sean Farnham
Starting Lineups:
BYU: Jahshire Hardnett, Zac Seljaas, Yoeli Childs, TJ Haws, Connor Harding 
UNLV: Kris Clyburn, Noah Robotham, Joel Ntambwe, Jonathan Tchamwa Tchatchoua, Cheikh Mbacke Diong

San Diego State
Series History: BYU leads series 48–24
Broadcasters: Carter Blackburn & Pete Gillen
Starting Lineups:  
BYU: Jahshire Hardnett, Zac Seljaas, Yoeli Childs, TJ Haws, Connor Harding
San Diego State: Devin Watson, Jalen McDaniels, Matt Mitchell, Jordan Schakel, Jeremy Hemsley

Mississippi State
Series History: Series even 1–1
Broadcasters: Kevin Fitzgerald & Daymeon Fishback
Starting Lineups:
BYU: Jahshire Hardnett, Zac Seljaas, Yoeli Childs, TJ Haws, Connor Harding 
Mississippi State: Nick Weatherspoon, Lamar Peters, Quinndary Weatherspoon, Abdul Ado, Aric Holman

Pacific
Series History: BYU leads series 10–6
Broadcasters: Steve Quis & Richie Schueler
Starting Lineups:  
BYU: Yoeli Childs, McKay Cannon, TJ Haws, Luke Worthington, Connor Harding
Pacific: Jahlil Tripp, Lafayette Dorsey, Anthony Townes, Brandon McGhee, Ajare Sanni

Saint Mary's
Series History: Series even 13–13
Broadcasters: Dave Feldman & Adrian Branch
Starting Lineups:
BYU: Yoeli Childs, McKay Cannon, TJ Haws, Luke Worthington, Connor Harding 
Saint Mary's: Tanner Krebs, Jordan Hunter, Jordan Ford, Tommy Kuhse, Malik Fitts

Portland
Series History: BYU leads series 18–2
Broadcasters: Dave McCann, Blaine Fowler, & Spencer Linton
Starting Lineups: 
Portland:  Jojo Walker, Marcus Shaver Jr., Josh McSwiggan, Theo Akwuba, Tahirou Diabate
BYU: Yoeli Childs, McKay Cannon, TJ Haws, Luke Worthington, Connor Harding

Santa Clara
Series History: BYU leads series 30–6
Broadcasters: Dave McCann, Blaine Fowler, & Spencer Linton
Starting Lineups:
Santa Clara: Trey Wertz, Tahj Eaddy, Josip Vrankic, Josh Martin, Guglielmo Caruso
BYU: Yoeli Childs, McKay Cannon, TJ Haws, Luke Worthington, Connor Harding

Pepperdine
Series History: BYU leads series 13–9
Broadcasters: Eric Rothman & Adrian Branch
Starting Lineups: 
BYU: Yoeli Childs, McKay Cannon, TJ Haws, Luke Worthington, Connor Harding 
Pepperdine: Colbey Ross, Jade' Smith, Darnell Dunn, Kameron Edwards, Eric Cooper Jr.

San Francisco
Series History: BYU leads series 19–6
Broadcasters: Barry Tompkins & Kelenna Azubuike
Starting Lineups:
BYU: Yoeli Childs, McKay Cannon, TJ Haws, Luke Worthington, Connor Harding 
San Francisco: Frankie Ferrari, Jimbo Lull, Charles Minlend, Nate Renfro, Jordan Ratinho

Saint Mary's
Series History: Saint Mary's leads series 14–13
Broadcasters: Steve Quis & Dan Dickau
Starting Lineups:
Saint Mary's: Tanner Krebs, Jordan Hunter, Jordan Ford, Tommy Kuhse, Malik Fitts
BYU: Yoeli Childs, McKay Cannon, TJ Haws, Luke Worthington, Connor Harding

Gonzaga
Series History: Gonzaga leads series 15–6
Broadcasters: Dave Feldman & Dan Dickau
Starting Lineups:
Gonzaga: Josh Perkins, Brandon Clarke, Rui Hachimura, Zach Norvell Jr., Coery Kispert
BYU: Yoeli Childs, McKay Cannon, TJ Haws, Luke Worthington, Connor Harding

Loyola Marymount
Series History: BYU leads series 14–5
Broadcasters: Dave McCann, Blaine Fowler, & Spencer Linton
Starting Lineups:
Loyola Marymount: Eli Scott, James Batemon, Dameane Douglas, Mattias Markusson, Jeffery McClendon
BYU: Yoeli Childs, Gavin Baxter, McKay Cannon, TJ Haws, Connor Harding

Portland
Series History: BYU leads series 19–2
Broadcasters: Steve Quis & Richie Schueler
Starting Lineups: 
BYU: Nick Emery, Yoeli Childs, McKay Cannon, Gavin Baxter, TJ Haws
Portland: JoJo Walker, Marcus Shaver Jr., Theo Akwuba, Franklin Porter, Jacob Tryon

Pacific
Series History: BYU leads series 11–6
Broadcasters: Dave McCann, Blaine Fowler, & Spencer Linton
Starting Lineups:  
Pacific: Jahlil Tripp, Roberto Galliant, Anthony Townes, Jeremiah Bailey, Kendall Small
BYU: Nick Emery, Yoeli Childs, McKay Cannon, Gavin Baxter, TJ Haws

San Diego
Series History: BYU leads series 14–5
Broadcasters: Steve Quis & Casey Jacobsen
Starting Lineups: 
BYU: Nick Emery, Yoeli Childs, McKay Cannon, Gavin Baxter, TJ Haws
San Diego: Isaiah Pineiro, Tyler Williams, Olin Carter III, Isaiah Wright, Yauhen Massalski

Loyola Marymount
Series History: BYU leads series 15–5
Broadcasters: Steve Quis, Ryan Hollins, & Kirsten Watson
Starting Lineups:
BYU: Nick Emery, Yoeli Childs, McKay Cannon, Gavin Baxter, TJ Haws
Loyola Marymount: Eli Scott, James Batemon, Dameane Douglas, Mattias Markusson, Jeffery McClendon

San Francisco
Series History: BYU leads series 19–7
Broadcasters: Dave McCann, Blaine Fowler & Spencer Linton
Starting Lineups:
San Francisco: Frankie Ferrari, Jimbo Lull, Charles Minlend, Nate Renfro, Jordan Ratinho
BYU: Nick Emery, Yoeli Childs, McKay Cannon, TJ Haws, Gavin Baxter

Gonzaga
Series History: Gonzaga leads series 16–6
Broadcasters: Eric Rothman & Sean Farnham
Starting Lineups:
BYU: Nick Emery, Yoeli Childs, McKay Cannon, TJ Haws, Gavin Baxter
Gonzaga: Geno Crandall, Jack Beach, Josh Perkins, Rui Hachimura, Jeremy Jones

San Diego
Series History: BYU leads series 15–5
Broadcasters: Dave McCann, Blaine Fowler & Spencer Linton
Starting Lineups: 
San Diego: Isaiah Pineiro, Yauhen Massalski, Isaiah Wright, Tyler Williams, Olin Carter III 
BYU: Luke Worthington, Yoeli Childs, TJ Haws, McKay Cannon, Nick Emery

References

 

2018-19 team
BYU
2018 in sports in Utah
2019 in sports in Utah